Longdon is a civil parish in the district of Lichfield, Staffordshire, England.  It contains 32 buildings that are recorded in the National Heritage List for England.  Of these, four are listed at Grade II*, the middle of the three grades, and the others are at Grade II, the lowest grade.  The parish contains the villages of Longdon, Gentleshaw, Upper Longdon, smaller settlements, and the surrounding countryside.  Most of the listed buildings are houses and associated structures, cottages, farmhouses and farm buildings.  The other buildings include a church, a country house and associated structures, the remains of another country house, a former water mill, and a former windmill.


Key

Buildings

References

Citations

Sources

Lists of listed buildings in Staffordshire